Park Choong-Kyun (박충균; born on June 20, 1973) is a South Korea football former player. He is currently a manager of Seoul E-Land FC of K League 2.

Club career

International career 
He was part of the South Korea football team in 1996 Summer Olympics, who finished third in Group C.

Managerial career

External links
 
 

1973 births
Living people
Association football defenders
South Korean footballers
South Korea international footballers
Suwon Samsung Bluewings players
Gimcheon Sangmu FC players
Seongnam FC players
Busan IPark players
Daejeon Hana Citizen FC players
K League 1 players
Footballers at the 1996 Summer Olympics
Olympic footballers of South Korea
Guam national football team managers
Hanoi FC managers
Seoul E-Land FC managers
Konkuk University alumni
Expatriate football managers in China
South Korean football managers
South Korean expatriate football managers